The Bezirk Frankfurt, also Bezirk Frankfurt (Oder), was a district (Bezirk) of East Germany. The administrative seat and the main town was Frankfurt (Oder).

History
The district was established, with the other 13, on 25 July 1952, substituting the old German states. After 3 October 1990 it was disestablished due to the German reunification, becoming again part of the state of Brandenburg.

Geography

Position
The Bezirk Frankfurt bordered with East Berlin and the Bezirke of Neubrandenburg, Potsdam and Cottbus. It bordered also with Poland.

Subdivision
The Bezirk was divided into 12 Kreise: 3 urban districts (Stadtkreise) and 9 rural districts (Landkreise): 
Urban districts : Eisenhüttenstadt, Frankfurt (Oder), Schwedt.
Rural districts : Angermünde; Bad Freienwalde; Beeskow; Bernau; Eberswalde; Eisenhüttenstadt-Land; Fürstenwalde; Seelow; Strausberg.

References

Frankfurt
Bezirk Frankfurt
Frankfurt (Oder)
20th century in Brandenburg